Milorad Vučelić (born 17 June 1948) is a Serbian journalist and businessman.

He is the president of FK Partizan, editor-in-chief of Večernje novosti, president of the Partizan Sports Society and owner of Serbian weekly magazine Pečat.

Early life
Vučelić was born into a family originating from Montenegro that, after the end of the Second World War, settled in the northern Serbian village of Sivac in the municipality of Kula in what was then PR Serbia, FPR Yugoslavia. After finishing elementary school in Crvenka and high school in Vrbas, he moved to Belgrade to study law at the University of Belgrade's Faculty of Law.

Career
Vučelić is a former vice-president of the Socialist Party of Serbia. He was the general director of the Radio Television of Serbia from 1992 to 1995. Vučelić was detained during Operation Sabre in 2003 but was quickly released.

FK Partizan
In 2014, he became the vice-president of FK Partizan. In 2016, he was selected as president of FK Partizan. His predecessor was Ivan Ćurković who took on the role of honorary president.

Personal life
He was married to actress  with whom he has a son named Branislav and a daughter named Ana. By descent, Vučelić is a member of the Bratonožići clan. Vučelić's father was one of the upper-echelon members of the Yugoslav State Security Administration stationed in Subotica.

References

External links
 
 FK Partizan profile
 Politika Online profile

  
 

1948 births
Living people
People from Kula, Serbia
Serbian businesspeople
Serbian journalists
Serbian socialists
Serbian politicians
Socialist Party of Serbia politicians
Democratic Socialist Party (Serbia) politicians
Serbian sports executives and administrators
University of Belgrade Faculty of Law alumni
FK Partizan presidents
Serbian people of Montenegrin descent